Manoranjan Movies is a Punjabi 24×7 Movie and Music television channel, owned by Manoranjan TV Group. The channel is a free-to-air and launched on 8 Feb 2016. The channel is available across all major cable and DTH platforms.

References

Manoranjan Group
Hindi-language television channels in India
Television channels and stations established in 2016
Punjabi-language television channels in India
Television stations in New Delhi

Movie channels in India